Kushboo is a 2008 Hindi romantic movie directed by Rajesh Ram Singh. The lead actors, Rishi Rehan and Avantikka, both made their Bollywood debuts with this film. The film was released in theaters on 20 June 2008. It is similar in theme as Fools Rush In, a 1997 romantic comedy directed by Andy Tennant and starring Matthew Perry and Salma Hayek.

Plot
A young, ambitious and successful professional like Raghu needs to go to Chandigarh before his posting to New York as his last assignment. For Raghu career takes top priority in his life.

In Chandigarh, he seems to be destined to cross path with a girl to whom he is inadvertently drawn. But each time Pinky flits away even before he can approach her. When they do meet and get to know each other they realize that they share a very strong bonding. And as usual Pinky once again vanishes from Raghu’s life. When they accidentally bump into each other months later, Pinky has one request...that he meet her family just once. For Pinki family takes top priority in her life.

Raghu meets the big, boisterous Punjabi family only to be drawn into the warmth of the large family. Will Raghu be able to turn his back on a loving family? Will Raghu marry Pinky? Will Pinky change her mind about letting him go? Is career more important than a loving family? Raghu is in a dilemma but not Pinky... Khusboo is a love story that spreads the fragrance of love amidst strong family values...

Cast and crew

Cast
Rishi Rehan as Raghu
Avantikka as Pinky
Ninad Kamat
Himani Shivpuri
Prem Chopra
Raj Babbar
Vivek Marwah
Aastha Rathore
Dolly Bindra
Vindu Dara Singh
Bikramjeet Kanwarpal

Crew
Director: Rajesh Ram Singh
Producer: Chirag Nihalani
Presenter: Pahlaj Nihalani
Writer: Pathik Vats
Music Director: Adnan Sami
Lyricist: Javed Akhtar
Playback Singers: Adnan Sami, Udit Narayan, Mahalaxmi Iyer, Shaan, Kay Kay, Shankar Mahadevan, Sunidhi Chauhan, Shreya Ghosal, Amit Kumar
Choreographers: Chinni Prakash, Saroj Khan, Manish Malhotra
Cinematographer: C. Vijayashree
Editor: Sanjay Sankla
Art Director: Chokas Bharadwaj
Sound Designer: Sunil Pradhan
Costume Designers: Ashley Rebello, Jerry Dsouza
Publicity Designers: Trusha Patel
Background Sound: Amar Mohile

Soundtrack
Paake Tujhe - KK
Kyon Hai Mujhe Lagta
Tum Jo Mile Humko
Kyon Hai Mujhe Lagta - Remix
Dil Yeh Kahe
Kya Hai Sochti Tu
Badi Albeli Hai Tu
Badi Albeli Hai Tu - Remix
Dil Yeh Kahe - Remix

External links
 

2008 films
2000s Hindi-language films